Laila Youssifou (born 2 January 1996) is a Dutch rower. She competed in the women's quadruple sculls event at the 2020 Summer Olympics.

References

External links

1996 births
Living people
Dutch female rowers
Olympic rowers of the Netherlands
Rowers at the 2020 Summer Olympics
Place of birth missing (living people)
20th-century Dutch women
21st-century Dutch women
World Rowing Championships medalists for the Netherlands